San Gabriel Park is a park in Georgetown, Texas, United States. In 2012, the park was designated a Lone Star Legacy Park by the Texas Recreation & Parks Society.

References

External links
 

Georgetown, Texas
Parks in Texas